F.League Ocean Cup (in Japanese: "Fリーグオーシャンカップ") is a futsal tournament held in Japan. The organizer is the Japan Football Association (JFA) and Japan Futsal Federation (JFF). This tournament is a league cup of the F.League. In 2019, 20 teams participated in this tournament.

History 
In 2008, Takeda Teva Ocean Arena was completed as Asia's first full-scale futsal arena. In June 2008 this tournament was held for the first time. The organizer of the first tournament was not the Japan Football Association (JFA) but the Aichi Football Association. As of 2009, this tournament is the official league cup of the F.League. 

In 2013, Teva Takeda Pharma Ltd. withdrew from the tournament sponsors, so this tournament name was changed to the F.League Ocean Arena Cup. In 2014, the venue was moved from the Takeda Teva Ocean Arena to the Odawara Arena, so this tournament name was changed to the F.League Ocean Cup. In 2015, this tournament was held at the Kobe Green Arena and Kobe Central Gymnasium. In 2016, this tournament was not held.

Competition name 
 Taiyo Yakuhin Ocean Arena Cup (2008)
 F.League Taiyo Yakuhin Ocean Arena Cup (2009–2011)
 F.League Teva Ocean Arena Cup (2012)
 F.League Ocean Arena Cup (2013)
 F.League Ocean Cup (2014–present)

Results

Number of wins by club

References

External links 
 

Futsal competitions in Japan
2008 establishments in Japan